The 1918 Harvard Crimson football team represented Harvard University in the 1918 college football season. The Crimson finished with a 2–1 record under first-year head coach William F. Donovan.  Walter Camp did not select any Harvard players as first-team members of his 1918 College Football All-America Team.

Schedule

References

Harvard
Harvard Crimson football seasons
Harvard Crimson football
1910s in Boston